= Tahrimah Jannat Suravi =

Tahrimah Jannat Suravi (Bengali: তাহরিমা জান্নাত সুরভী) is a Bangladeshi judicial victim.
